The Northern Territory Rugby Union, or NTRU, is the governing body for the sport of rugby union within the Northern Territory in Australia. It is a member of Rugby Australia.

The Northern Territory Rugby Union manages competitions in several age groups and divisions, involving clubs from Darwin, Alice Springs, Katherine, and Nhulunbuy.

The NTRU also hosts the annual Hottest 7s tournament in Darwin, which draws Rugby 7s teams from around Australia and overseas and awards prize money to the winners.

Rugby union in Darwin started after Cyclone Tracy when there were many young men involved in the clean up and reconstruction of the city. The NTRU was founded in 1975.

The First Grade competition is contested by 5 teams from the Darwin area.

Casuarina Cougars
Darwin Dragons
Palmerstown Crocs
South Darwin Rabbitohs
University Pirates

See also
 Rugby union in the Northern Territory
 List of Australian club rugby union competitions

References

External links
 Official website: Northern Territory Rugby Union
 Official website: Darwin Hottest 7s

Australian rugby union governing bodies
Rugby union in the Northern Territory
Rug
1975 establishments in Australia
Sports organizations established in 1975